Zamalek Basketball Club (Arabic: نادي الزمالك لكرة السلة) also known as Zamalek B.C. or simply as Zamalek SC, is a men's professional  basketball club. based in  Giza, Egypt. and the major part of the Zamalek SC. The club is a founding member and shareholder of the Egyptian Basketball Federation, and competes in the Egyptian Basketball Super League (ESL), and the top-tier Africa-wide Africa League.

Zamalek is regarded as one of the most successful clubs in Egypt history; their squads have won 18 National League championships, including 5-in-a-row. They have played in three different National Leagues since 1937, including the Egyptian Kingdom Basketball League (1937–1952), Egyptian Republic Basketball League (1952–1972), Egyptian Basketball Super League (1972 onwards). They have also won 13 National Cup titles, 3 Egyptian Super Cup, 23 Cairo Basketball League, And 1 Basketball Africa League, 1 FIBA Africa League. The club plays domestic home matches in the Abdulrahman Fawzi Hall, Zamalek's supporters are known as White Knights. 

Zamalek is the 1st Egyptian team to participate in the Basketball Africa League, the FIBA Intercontinental Cup and the FIBA Africa Clubs Champions Cup. They have participated in every season of the Egyptian Basketball Super League without interruption since the inception of the league in 1972. They are the most successful Egyptian team in FIBA Africa competitions, being the first ever winner of the 2021 BAL season. They habe won the Egyptian Cup, and Egyptian Super Cup the most times as well, and won the Domestic Double 7 Times. They are the only Egyptian team to win the Domestic Triple three times. Zamalek have also been 3 times FABL runners-up, played a total of 5 finals, and have also participated 7 times in the Final Four. The first major achievement of Zamalek in African competitions was their presence in the 1971–72 FIBA African Champions Cup semi-finals, but it was in the 1970s that Zamalek made their biggest mark. They became the First Ever Egyptian club that reached the  Final, being runners-up in two consecutive seasons (1975 and 1976), winning their first Afro League title in 1992, (11-11-1992) After convincing and winning all matches in the group stage A round-robin tournament in Abdulrahman Fawzi Hall. After Final 1998, Zamalek become the most Egyptian team reached a Final Four in FABL in 6 Times. Most African Team win a Game in Euro League with 3 Game, 1st Game in (9-11-1978) 1978–79 Against Klosterneuburg, 2nd Game in (16-10-1980) 1980–81 Vs FC Porto, 3rd Game in (20-11-1980) 1980–81 Vs Viganello.

As parent athletic club was founded in 1911, has kept the team name changing frequently. From 1937 until 1941, it was called Faiez International Sports Club (C.I.S.C.), a.k.a. El Mokhtalat Club (Mixed Courts). From 1941 to 1952, Farouk I, King of Egypt and Sudan, bestowed the royal sponsorship on the club, and the club name was renamed to Nady Farouk El Awal (Farouk I Club). Ismail Bak Shirin of Mohammed Ali's family took the post of vice president. From 1952 until present the renamed to Zamalek SC. After the army coup in 1952, the club was renamed Zamalek after the area where the club was situated. The club later moved for the last time to 26 July Street, and occupied an area of 35 acres (140,000 m2) and hosted 24 different sports.

History

1937 – 1950s

1960 – 1970s

1980s – 1990s

Zamalek in Europe 
Zamalek was previously invited to participate in the FIBA European Champions Cup (now known as the EuroLeague) seven times. The first participation was in the 1970–71 season, during which the club faced Real Madrid Baloncesto in the second round of the tournament. The second participation was in the 1974–75 season, during which the club faced Slavia VŠ Praha in the second round of the tournament. The third participation was in the 1975–76 season, during which the club faced PBC Academic in the first round of the tournament. The fourth participation was in the 1978–79 season, with Zamalek in group A, alongside Real Madrid Baloncesto, Budapesti Honvéd SE and Klosterneuburg Dukes, the club came in fourth place in its group after winning one match. The fifth participation was in the 1979–80 season, with Zamalek in group A, alongside KK Bosna Royal and BC Levski Sofia. The sixth participation was in the 1980–81 season, with Zamalek in group A, alongside Real Madrid Baloncesto, AS Viganello Basket and Porto, the club came in third place in its group after winning two matches. The seventh and to date last participation was in the 1981–82 season, with Zamalek in group C, alongside KK Partizan, Slavia VŠ Praha and Eczacıbaşı SK, but Zamalek withdrew from the tournament before playing any match, and here ended Zamalek's journey in Europe.

2000 – 2004

2005 – 2014: Crisis

2015 – 2021

Basketball Africa League (BAL) Champions 
Zamalek won the Egyptian Super League in 2019, its first title in 11 years, to qualify for the inaugural season of the Basketball Africa League (BAL), and be the first Egyptian team to participate in Basketball Africa League. In November 2020, Zamalek signed Spanish coach Augustí Julbe as their new head coach. In the 2021 BAL season, Zamalek won its second international title (after the 1992 FIBA Africa Clubs Champions Cup) and the first-ever BAL championship after defeating US Monastir in the Finals. Point guard Walter Hodge was named the first-ever MVP while Anas Mahmoud was awarded the Defensive Player of the Year. Another notable team member was 18 year old Mohab Yasser, who started all games.

After winning the league title in the 2020–21 season, defeating Al Ittihad in the finals, Zamalek stood alone as the most successful basketball club in the Egyptian Basketball Super League with a record 15 titles. Zamalek participated in the 2022 FIBA Intercontinental Cup becoming the first Egyptian team to participate in this competition.

Honours

Domestic Competitions 

National Championships – (18; Record)

 Egyptian Super League
Winners (15; Record): 1973–74, 1974–75, 1975–76, 1976–77, 1977–1978, 1979–80, 1980–81, 1987–88, 1990–91, 1996–97, 1997–98, 2002–03, 2006–07, 2018–19, 2020–21

 Egyptian Kingdom Basketball Championship (Defunct)
Winners (2): 1948–49, 1949–50

 Egyptian Republic Championship (Defunct)
Winners (1): 1969–70

 Egyptian Cup
Winners (13; Record): 1974–75, 1978–79, 1979–80, 1980–81, 1990–91, 1991–92, 1996–97, 1997–98, 1999–20, 2000–01, 2001–02, 2002–03, 2005–06

 Egyptian Super Cup
Winners (3; Record): 1997, 1998, 2003

 Cairo League Championship
Winners (23): 1947, 1952, 1959, 1966, 1967, 1969, 1970, 1972, 1973, 1974, 1975, 1976, 1977, 1981, 1982, 1983, 1984, 1985, 1989–90, 1990–91, 1992–93, 1996–97, 2006–07

African Competitions 

 Basketball Africa League
Winners (1): 2021
Third place (1): 2022

 FIBA Africa Clubs Champions Cup (Defunct)
Winners (1): 1992
Runners-up (3): 1975, 1976, 1998
Third place (2): 1972, 1983

Worldwide Competitions 

 FIBA Intercontinental Cup
Fourth place (1): 2022

Records 
The times Zamalek have won more than one major trophy in one season.

Season by season

Top performances in European & African and worldwide competitions

The road to the African Cup victories

1992 FIBA Africa Clubs Champions Cup

2021 Basketball Africa League

Individual awards

BAL Best Record 
6–0 (2021)
7–1 (2022)
All BAL First Team 
Anas Mahmoud (2021)
Walter Hodge (2021)
Édgar Sosa (2022)
BAL MVP
Walter Hodge (2021)
BAL Best Defender 
Anas Mahmoud (2021)
BAL Sportsmanship Award
Anas Mahmoud (2022)
Egyptian Super League MVP
Terrell Stoglin (2018–19)
Anas Mahmoud (2020–21)
Egyptian Super League Best Younger Player
Mohab Yasser (2020–21)

Players

Current roster 

The following is the Zamalek 13-man roster for the 2022 BAL season.

Depth chart

Notable players 
Current players
 Mostafa Kejo (2012–present)
 Omar Hesham (2013–present)
 Anas Osama Mahmoud (2018–present)
 Ahmed Hatem (2018–present)
 Eslam Salem (2019–present)
 Ike Diogu (2022–present)
 D. J. Strawberry (2022–present)
Former players
 Haytham Elsaharty (2008–2021)
 Terrell Stoglin (2018–2019)
 Mohab Yasser (2020–2021)
 Mouloukou Diabate (2021)
 Walter Hodge (2021)
 Édgar Sosa (2021–2022)

List of head coaches
The following coaches have held the position of head coach of Zamalek SC basketball team (incomplete):
   Miodrag Perišić: (2009–2011)
  Essam Abdel Hamid: (2018–2020)
  Tariq Selim: (2020)
  Augustí Julbe: (2020–2021)
  Vangelis Angelou: (2021–2022)
  Will Voigt: (2022–present)

Logo and colors 

In 1941, the royal emblem of the Kingdom of Egypt and Sudan was the official emblem of the club at the time; when the club's name changed from "El Mokhtalat Club" to "Farouk Club" by royal order from Farouk I. After the revolution of July 23, 1952 on the royal rule in Egypt, the club's name and logo changed; the logo is a mixture of the sporting model and the ancient Egyptian civilization. The logo's main colors express peace and struggle and have not changed since its establishment. The home jersey uses the original Zamalek colours. In the upper half of the logo, the archer that points towards the target appears in a pharaonic uniform as an indication of the common goal between the arrow and Zamalek. Zamalek is famous for the stability of its basic colors, which have not changed throughout the club's history, which extends since 1911, as it is distinguished by the white kits with two parallel red lines in the middle.

Home Arena 

{| class="wikitable"
|-
! Location
! Arena's name
! Period
|-
| Giza
| Abdulrahman Fawzi Hall
| 1986–present

When Zamalek SC began to create the teams of handball, basketball and, volleyball, they saw the importance to build an arena to host the home matches of these teams. They first began to make the designs in 1970s, later they began working to build the covered hall, which was established in 1986, which they named Abdulrahman Fawzi Hall, in the honor of one of the legend of Zamalek SC, he was the first ever Arab and African footballer to score at the FIFA World Cup, when he scored twice for Egypt in their 4–2 loss against Hungary in 1934, he is also Egypt's top goalscorer at the FIFA World Cup.

The opening ceremony of Abdulrahman Fawzi Hall was held with the opening ceremony of the 5th Arab Volleyball Clubs Championship in 1986, which was won by Zamalek volleyball team for the first time in the club's history, defeating MC Alger in the final which was held in Abdulrahman Fawzi Hall.

Supporters 

Zamalek has an ultras group named the Ultras White Knights that was founded on 17 March 2007 and is known for its pyrotechnic displays. Their motto is "Brotherhood in blood and fans of the free public club". The Zamalek fans have always been supportive of all sports teams of the Zamalek Sporting Club, and the fans of Zamalek were the first to launch the term "Kings of The Halls" in Africa and the Arab world, as the sports teams of Zamalek Sporting Club achieved domestic and international achievements. The fans of Zamalek have always been associated with the sports halls from the 90s until now.

See also 
 Zamalek SC
 Zamalek SC Handball
 Zamalek SC Volleyball
 Zamalek TV

References

External links 

Facebook
Twitter

Basketball
Basketball teams established in 1937
Basketball teams in Egypt
Sport in Giza
1937 establishments in Egypt
Basketball Africa League teams